Syed Fatemi Ahmed Rumi was a major general of the Bangladesh Army and former Director General of Special Security Force.

Career
During the Bangladesh Nationalist Party rule from 2001 to 2006, Rumi served as the Director General of Special Security Force. He backed the military supported caretaker government that took power during the 2006–2008 Bangladeshi political crisis. During his service, others officers referred to him as Shada (white) Rumi to distinguish him from his contemporary Major General Sadik Hasan Rumi, who was known as Kala (black) Rumi. 

In January 2007, Rumi was made the general officer commanding of the 66th Infantry Division and Major General Sheikh Md Manirul Islam replaced him as the Director General of Special Security Force. The 66th Infantry Division was based in Rangpur Cantonment. He worked with Chief of Staff of Bangladesh Army, Moeen U Ahmed, to establish Rangpur University and a new political party called Jago Bangladesh.

In February 2009, Rumi was made the chairman of Bangladesh Institute of International and Strategic Studies a state operated think tank. The Government of Bangladesh sent him and Lieutenant General Md Aminul Karim, commandant of the National Defence College, to forced retirement in March 2009.

References

Living people
Bangladesh Army generals
Year of birth missing (living people)